The 2015 Kazan Shopping Center fire occurred on 11 March 2015 when a fire and partial collapse of the Admiral shopping complex in the Russian city of Kazan killed at least 17 people with 55 more injured.

Fire 
The fire reportedly started in a first floor cafe, next to the Admiral center. The building collapsed, trapping 25 individuals under the rubble.

A security guard initially attempted to extinguish the fire himself, and there was a delay in calling for first responders. It affected an area of 4,000 square meters (43,000 square feet).

Five hundred riot police were sent to seal off the center and create a line around the building as business owners attempted to re-enter the building and save goods. A fire train and helicopter were also used in order to get the fire under control.

Victims 
Kazan law enforcers reported that the number of injured by the fire had exceeded 30, with nineteen people being transported to the hospital and fourteen going to the doctors or hospitals on their own choice.

On March 12 it was reported that based on reports by workers and relatives, five people were confirmed dead and 25 missing. By March 14, the number of deceased victims had risen to 15 with 17 more missing, the final death total of 17 was released on March 15 with eight foreign nationals being identified among the dead.

Investigation 
Investigators have detained the shopping centers director and at the time were looking into multiple theories including arson.

Two firefighters have received widespread criticism with the selfie style photo in front of the burning building, and officials are investigating over whether they should be removed from their positions. The Regional Emergency Situations Department stated that the actions of the two are "not characteristic of those who work hard every day, tirelessly saving lives."

Criminal charges 
A local court sanctioned the arrest of the shopping mall's chief executive on charges of fire safety regulations. The Russia Investigative Committee placed Minzilya Safina a former bailiff to a wanted list for failure to enforce a regional courts 2013 decision to rectify the shopping centers numerous fire safety violations.

Response 
Tatarstan President Rustam Minnikhanov stated that managers of the center had failed to comply with fire safety regulations. He also decreed a Republic-wide day of morning, and that the families of each Russian citizen among the victims would receive 1 million rubles (US$16,000) in compensation, and foreign victims would have the cost of transporting the remains covered.

See also
 1917 Kazan Gunpowder Plant fire
 2018 Kemerovo fire
 Lame Horse fire

References

2015 disasters in Russia
2015 fires in Asia 
2015 fires in Europe
Fires in Russia
Defunct shopping malls
21st century in Kazan
March 2015 events in Russia
Department store fires
Building collapses in Russia
Building collapses in 2015
Building collapses caused by fire